Herman Daggett (September 11, 1766 – May 19, 1832) was an American Presbyterian minister and early animal rights writer.

Biography

Daggett was born on September 11, 1766, at Walpole, Massachusetts. He was the son of physician Ebenezer Daggett, brother of Naphtali Daggett. He moved to Wrentham as a boy. Daggett attended Brown University in 1784 and graduated in 1788. He studied theology under Nathanael Emmons. Daggett became a licensed Congregational preacher in 1789. He preached at Long Island and Southampton. He joined the pastoral office on April 12, 1792. He married Sarah, daughter of Colonel Mathewson on September 3, 1792. He resigned from Southampton and joined the pastoral care of the West Hampton church. He held this position from 1797 to 1801.  He became pastor of the church at Fire Place and Middle Island in Brookhaven until 1807.  After this he preached at New Canaan, Connecticut and North Salem, New York. Daggett was President (1818–1824) of the Foreign Mission School in Cornwall, Connecticut. Daggett died on May 19, 1832.

Animal rights

On September 7, 1791, Daggett gave a lecture at Providence College (now Brown University) entitled "The Rights of Animals: An Oration" which was one of the earliest calls for animal protection in the United States. The lecture was his master's thesis and was printed in 1792 by David Frothingham. It has been described as "the first known American treatise on animal rights". It was re-printed by the American Society for the Prevention of Cruelty to Animals in 1926.

Selected publications

The Rights of Animals (1792) 
An Abridgement of the Writings of Lewis Cornaro: A Nobleman of Venice on Health and Long Life (1824)
The American Reader (1841)

See also

Humphrey Primatt

References

1766 births
1832 deaths
American animal rights scholars
American Presbyterian ministers
Brown University alumni
People from Walpole, Massachusetts